Andrey Pedan (born 3 July 1993) is a Russian professional ice hockey defenceman for SKA Saint Petersburg of the Kontinental Hockey League (KHL).

Playing career
After his first major junior season in the North American Ontario Hockey League, with the Guelph Storm in 2010–11, Pedan was drafted 63rd overall by the New York Islanders in the 2011 NHL Entry Draft.

On 3 April 2013, Pedan was signed to a three-year entry-level contract with the Islanders. Unable to establish himself amongst the Islanders' prospects within the affiliates, the Bridgeport Sound Tigers of the AHL and the Stockton Thunder of the ECHL, Pedan was traded in the 2014–15 season by the Islanders to the Vancouver Canucks in exchange for Alexandre Mallet and a third-round pick on 26 November 2014.

On 1 December 2015, Pedan made his NHL debut for the Canucks against the Los Angeles Kings. On 15 March 2016, Pedan was recalled by the Canucks along with Brendan Gaunce.

On 3 October 2017, on the eve of the 2017–18 season, Pedan was traded by the Canucks along with a fourth-round pick in 2018 to the Pittsburgh Penguins in exchange for Derrick Pouliot. He was assigned to AHL affiliate, the Wilkes-Barre/Scranton Penguins for the duration of the campaign. He notched AHL personal highs of 9 goals and 26 points in 52 games.

On 4 July 2018, Pedan as a restricted free agent from the Penguins opted to sign a two-year contract to return to Russia with reigning champions, Ak Bars Kazan of the Kontinental Hockey League (KHL). On 29 April 2020, Pedan was re-signed to a one-year contract.

On 4 May 2021, Pedan signed a two-year contract with HC Dynamo Moscow of the KHL.

Following the conclusion of the 2021–22 season, Pedan was traded with a year remaining on his contract to SKA Saint Petersburg in exchange for Alexander Skorenov on 25 May 2022.

Personal life
Pedan was born in Kaunas, Lithuania, but grew up in Moscow, Russia. Pedan is fluent in both Russian and English.

Career statistics

Regular season and playoffs

International

References

External links
 

1993 births
Living people
Ak Bars Kazan players
Bridgeport Sound Tigers players
HC Dynamo Moscow players
Guelph Storm players
New York Islanders draft picks
Russian ice hockey defencemen
SKA Saint Petersburg players
Stockton Thunder players
Utica Comets players
Vancouver Canucks players
Wilkes-Barre/Scranton Penguins players